Theodore Reservoir is a man-made reservoir along the Whitesand River in the Canadian province of Saskatchewan. The lake was formed with the building of Theodore Dam in 1964. The reservoir and dam were named after the nearby community of Theodore. Whitesand River is the primary inflow and outflow for the reservoir. Lawrie Creek, which begins in the Beaver Hills, flows into the lake on the western side near the dam.

While there are no communities on the lake's shore, there is a regional park and a Bible camp on the western side. The lake is accessed from Highways 651 and 726 and nearby communities include Springside and Good Spirit Acres.

Theodore Dam 
Theodore Dam (19-28-06 W2) was built in 1964 along the course of the Whitesand River to create Theodore Reservoir. The dam is 14.6 metres high and the reservoir holds 14,802 decametres of water. The outflow from the lake is at the southern end of the dam.

Access to the dam is from Highway 726 and there's a boat launch at the northern end of the dam.

Whitesand Regional Park 
Whitesand Regional Park is a regional park on the western shore of Theodore Reservoir. The park is accessed from Highway 651, which runs north from Theodore and the Yellowhead Highway.

The Whitesand Regional Park first opened on 4 May 1965. Since then, through regular expansion and investment, upgrades such as a picnic area, golf course, campground, boat launches, mini-golf, modern washroom and shower facilities, and a children's playground were added. The campground is made up of 30 electrified sites with access to potable water. Whitesand Regional Park Golf course is a sand greens, 9-hole course that originally opened in 1969.

Fish species 
Fish commonly found in the lake include northern pike, walleye, and perch. Notably, the lake is stocked annually with 500,000 walleye fry.

See also 
List of lakes of Saskatchewan
Saskatchewan Water Security Agency
Dams and reservoirs in Saskatchewan
Tourism in Saskatchewan
Whitesand Dam

References 

Lakes of Saskatchewan
Dams in Saskatchewan